Saint-Martin-d'Abbat is a commune and town in the Loiret department in the administrative region of Centre-Val de Loire, France.
It is located in the natural region of Loire Valley.

See also
Communes of the Loiret department

References

Saintmartindabbat